Scream is the third studio album by drummer Chad Wackerman, released on June 20, 2000 through Favored Nations Entertainment.

Critical reception

Glenn Astarita at All About Jazz gave Scream a positive review, praising Wackerman's "intrinsic musical approach to the drums". He described the album as following the same direction as Forty Reasons (1991) and The View (1993), but also remarked that "overall, the album lacks some of the tenacity witnessed on the drummer's previous projects as the invariable pace and somewhat plodding flow supersedes some of its brighter moments."

John W. Patterson at AllMusic gave the album four stars out of five, saying "Scream does a great job of measuring up to all those prior efforts overall and continues Wackerman's reputation for great fusion", in response to whether it measures up to Forty Reasons and The View. He went on to praise guitarist James Muller as "superb [...] tight, fluid, innovative" and likened his playing to that of Allan Holdsworth, whom previously played with Wackerman.

Track listing

Personnel
Chad Wackerman – drums, percussion, production
James Muller – guitar
Daryl Pratt – synthesizer, vibraphone, percussion
Jim Cox – synthesizer, piano, organ
Leon Gaer – bass
Walt Fowler – flugelhorn
Guy Dickerson – engineering, mixing
Bernard Mathews – engineering

References

External links
In Review: Chad Wackerman "Scream" at Guitar Nine Records

Chad Wackerman albums
2000 albums
Favored Nations albums